Juan Manuel Landaida (born 15 September 1976) is a retired Argentine footballer.

Biography
Landaida started his career in Paraguay, then played for Huracán de Corrientes at Primera División Argentina 1996–97. He remained at Corrientes for Primera B Nacional 1997–98,

Landaida then left for Uruguayan side Liverpool de Montevideo. In August 2004, along with Carlos Andrés García and Gonzalo Vicente were loaned to Serie B side Venezia. Venezia had also signed Horacio Erpen and Damián Macaluso from Primera División de Uruguay, which all had passport of European Union member as second nationality. After the bankrupt of the Venice club, he returned to Montevideo.

In January 2006, he signed a -year contract with Serie B side Triestina, which the club alsosigned Horacio Erpen. He just played 12 league matches in the second half of 2005–06 season.

In August 2006, he joined Serie C1 side Sambenedettese on loan.

In the next season, he signed a 2-year contract with Benevento. He played 23 league matches for the Serie C2 champion. Late his contract was extended and played regularly in Lega Pro Prima Divisione.

References

External links
 
 Profile at Tenfiel Digital 
 
 Profile at AIC.Football.it  
 

1976 births
Living people
Footballers from Buenos Aires
Argentine footballers
Argentine expatriate footballers
Argentine Primera División players
Serie B players
Club Nacional footballers
Liverpool F.C. (Montevideo) players
Huracán Corrientes footballers
Venezia F.C. players
U.S. Triestina Calcio 1918 players
A.S. Sambenedettese players
Benevento Calcio players
Expatriate footballers in Paraguay
Expatriate footballers in Uruguay
Expatriate footballers in Italy
Argentine expatriate sportspeople in Italy
Association football central defenders
Argentine expatriate sportspeople in Paraguay
Argentine expatriate sportspeople in Uruguay